Asare Parish is an administrative unit of Jēkabpils Municipality in the Selonia region of Latvia.

Towns, villages and settlements of Asare parish 

Parishes of Latvia
Jēkabpils Municipality
Selonia